Sarah Hrdy (née Blaffer; born July 11, 1946) is an American anthropologist and primatologist who has made major contributions to evolutionary psychology and sociobiology . She is considered "a highly recognized pioneer in modernizing our understanding
of the evolutionary basis of female behavior in both nonhuman and human primates". In 2013, Hrdy received a Lifetime Career Award for Distinguished Scientific Contribution from the Human Behavior and Evolution Society.

Hrdy is a Professor Emerita of the Department of Anthropology at the University of California, Davis. She has also been an Associate at the Peabody Museum of Archaeology and Ethnology at Harvard University. She has been selected as one of the 21 Leaders in Animal Behavior (2009). In acknowledgment of her achievements, Discover magazine recognized her in 2002 as one of the 50 most important women in science.

Biography

Early life
Sarah Blaffer was born on July 11, 1946, in Dallas, Texas. She was a granddaughter of Sarah Campbell Blaffer and Robert Lee Blaffer, a co-founder of Humble Oil. She was raised in Houston and attended St. John's School there.

Education
At age 18, Blaffer attended her mother's alma mater, Wellesley College in Massachusetts. She chose philosophy as her major, and she took creative writing courses. In one of her writing classes, she wrote a novel about Mayan culture. This decision led to Hrdy researching folklore of the Maya. In the end, she found the research more stimulating than the creation of the novel.

She eventually transferred to Radcliffe College and majored in anthropology. Her undergraduate thesis on the demon H'ik'al became the basis for her first book, The Black Man of Zincantan, published in 1972.
She was a member of Phi Beta Kappa, and graduated summa cum laude from Radcliffe in 1969 with a BA.

Interested in making films to teach people in developing countries, Hrdy took film-making courses at Stanford, but was disappointed with them.  Instead she was inspired by a Stanford class taught by Paul Ehrlich on the problems of overpopulation, and remarks by Harvard professor Irven DeVore, about black-faced Indian monkeys called langurs. Hrdy was taught that when numbers got too high within the troop, the male langurs would kill the babies in their group.

Hrdy changed course in mid-year and entered Harvard as a graduate student in 1970 to study primate behavior. She focused her PhD research around a field study of Hanuman langurs.  On the advice of Professor S.M. Mohnot, it was carried out in the area of Mount Abu, India. Her thesis advisor was Irven DeVore. She also worked closely with members of her thesis committee such as the evolutionary biologist Robert L. Trivers and E. O. Wilson. She received her thesis from Harvard in 1975.

Family
Sarah Blaffer met Daniel Hrdy at Harvard. He accompanied her on early visits to Mount Abu, and they married in 1972 in Kathmandu. They have three children: Katrinka (born 1976); Sasha (born 1982), a week before Hrdy was scheduled to present a paper at Cornell University; and Niko (born 1986). Sarah Blaffer Hrdy now lives with her husband in northern California, where they operate the Citrona Farms walnut plantation.

Career
Hrdy alternated research work in India with time at Harvard until around 1979, when she became quite ill while doing research in the field. From 1979 until 1984, she focused on writing and teaching at Harvard. In 1984, she joined the University of California at Davis as a professor of anthropology. Hrdy retired in 1996, becoming a professor emerita of anthropology at UC Davis, where she continues to be involved with the Animal Behavior Graduate Group.

Research

The Langurs of Abu
Sarah Hrdy first became interested in langurs during an undergraduate primate behavior class taught by anthropologist Irven DeVore in 1968. DeVore commented on the relationship between crowding and the killing of infants in langur colonies. After graduation, Hrdy returned to Harvard for graduate studies, with the goal of better understanding the phenomenon of infanticide in langur colonies. Working under the supervision of DeVore and Trivers provided Hrdy with an introduction to a newly emerging outlook on the social world—that of sociobiology—which crystallized at Harvard in the early 1970s and shaped Hrdy's enduring perspective on primatology.

Hrdy's PhD thesis tested the hypothesis that overcrowding causes infanticide in langur colonies. She went to Mount Abu in India to study Hanuman langurs and concluded that infanticide was independent of overcrowding—it was possibly an evolutionary tactic: When an outside male takes over a group, he usually proceeds to kill all infants. This postulated tactic would be very advantageous to the male langurs who practiced infanticide. Turnover in a langur tribe occurs approximately every 27 months. The male who is taking over has a very small window of opportunity to pass on his genes. If the females are nursing infants, it's likely that they won't ovulate for another year. Killing their dependent infants makes the females once again receptive to mating.

Female choice is subverted, as females are put under pressure to ovulate and are forced to breed with the infanticidal males. This is where the idea of sexual counter-strategies comes into play. Hrdy theorized that by mating with as many males as possible, particularly males who are not part of the colony, mothers are able to successfully protect their young, as males were unlikely to kill an infant if there was the slightest chance that it might be their own.

That gives an illusion of paternity. The goal of the male langur is to maximize the proportion of his offspring and, as Hrdy points out, a male who attacks his own offspring is rapidly selected against. While infanticide has been seemingly preserved across primate orders, Hrdy found no evidence to suggest that the human species has a 'genetic imperative' for infanticide.

In 1975, Hrdy was awarded her PhD for her research on langurs. In 1977 it was published in her second book, The Langurs of Abu: Female and Male Strategies of Reproduction. The controversy in the anthropology realm that her research sparked was not surprising—the classic belief that primates act for the good of the group was discarded, and the field of sociobiology gained increasing support. Many mistakenly assumed that she implied existence of an 'infanticidal gene' that could be conserved across primates. Today, her results and conclusions are widely accepted. Even Trivers, who once dismissed her convictions, admits that her theory regarding female sexual strategies has "worn well."

The Woman That Never Evolved
Hrdy's third book came out in 1981: The Woman That Never Evolved. She begins chapter one with a sentence indicating that the results of her work suggest females should be given a lot more credibility than previously thought. "Biology, it is sometimes thought, has worked against women." Here, Hrdy expands upon female primate strategies. The book is one of The New York Times''' Notable Books of 1981.

In 1984, Hrdy co-edited Infanticide: Comparative and Evolutionary Perspectives. It was selected as a 1984–1985 "Outstanding Academic Book" by Choice, the journal of the Association of College and Research Libraries.

Mother Nature
In 1999, Hrdy published Mother Nature: Maternal Instincts and How They Shape the Human Species. She examines "human mothers and infants in a broader comparative and evolutionary framework," informing and forming views of mother-infant interdependence from a sociobiological viewpoint.

She discusses how mothers are continually making trade-offs between quality and quantity, and weighing the best possible actions for them and their infant. Hrdy's view is that there is no defined 'maternal instinct': It depends on a number of variables and is therefore not innate, as once thought. She also stands by her view that humans have evolved as cooperative breeders, making them essentially unable to raise offspring without a helper.

This is where the concept of allomothering comes in—relatives other than the mother, such as the father, grandparents, and older siblings, as well as genetically unrelated helpers, such as nannies, nurses, and child care groups, who spend time with an infant, leaving the mother with more free time to meet her own needs.

Mothers and Others: The evolutionary origins of mutual understanding
In Mother Nature Hrdy argued that apes with the life history attributes of Homo sapiens could not have evolved unless alloparents in addition to parents had helped to care for and provision offspring, "the Cooperative Breeding Hypothesis".

In 2009 in Mothers and Others, Hrdy explored cognitive and emotional implications for infants growing up in what was (for an ape) a novel developmental context. Instead of relying on the single-minded dedication of their mothers, youngsters had to monitor and engage multiple caretakers as well.  Other apes possess cognitive wiring for rudimentary Theory of Mind, but with cooperative rearing, relevant potentials for mentalizing would have become more fully expressed, and thus rendered more visible to natural selection.  Over generations, those youngsters better at inter-subjective engagement would have been best cared for and fed, leading to directional Darwinian selection favoring peculiarly human capacities for intersubjective engagement.

In 2014, Mothers and Others, together with earlier work, earned Hrdy the National Academy's Award for Scientific Reviewing in honor of her "insightful and visionary synthesis of a broad range of data and concepts from across the social and biological sciences to illuminate the importance of biosocial processes among mothers, infants, and other social actors in forming the evolutionary crucible of human societies."

Because of her research on parenting, Hrdy is a strong advocate for making affordable child care a priority.

Philanthropy
The Sarah and Daniel Hrdy Visiting Fellowship in Conservation Biology is given to a student for scientific study and work in the Department of Organismic and Evolutionary Biology at Harvard University.

Bibliography

Books
1972: The Black-man of Zinacantan: A Central American Legend. The Texas Pan American Series. Austin: University of Texas Press. .
1977: The Langurs of Abu: Female and Male Strategies of Reproduction. Cambridge: Harvard University Press. .
1981: The Woman that Never Evolved. Cambridge: Harvard University Press. (Chosen by the New York Times Book Review as one of Notable Books of the Year in Science and Social Science.) 1982, Japanese edition, Tokyo: Shisaku-sha Publishing; 1984, 5th printing of paperback edition, Cambridge; 1984, 1st French edition, Des guenons et des femmes. Paris: Editions Tierce, in press, 2nd French edition, Paris: Payot et Rivage; 1985, Italian edition, La Donna Che Non si E'evoluta, Franco Angeli Editore. .
1984: Hausfater, G. and S. Hrdy, eds. Infanticide: Comparative and Evolutionary Perspectives. New York: Aldine Publishing Co. (Selected as one of the 1984-85 "Outstanding Academic Books" by Choice, the Journal of the Association of College and Research Libraries.) .
1999: Mother Nature: A History of Mothers, Infants and Natural Selection. New York: Pantheon. A BOMC Alternative Selection; selected by Publishers Weekly and by the Library Journal as one of Best Books of 1999 and a finalist for PEN USA West 2000 Literary Award for Research Nonfiction. Won the Howells Prize for Outstanding Contribution to Biological Anthropology. (Published in UK as Mother Nature: Natural selection and the female of the species. London: Chatto and Windus); also translated into Chinese, Dutch, French, German, Italian, Portuguese, Spanish, Japanese, Korean and Polish. .
2001: "The Past, Present, and Future of the Human Family." The Tanner Lectures on Human Values, Delivered at University of Utah February 27 and 28, 2001.
2005: The 92nd Dahlem Workshop Report, "Attachment and Bonding: A New Synthesis." Edited by C. S. Carter, L. Ahnert, K. E. Grossmann, S. B. Hrdy, M. E. Lamb, S. W. Porges, and N. Sachser. ©MIT Press. .
2009: Mothers and Others: The Evolutionary Origins of Mutual Understanding. Cambridge: Harvard University Press. .
2010: Myths, monkeys and motherhood: An intellectual autobiography. In Lee Drickamer and Donald Dewsbury (eds.), Leaders in Animal Behavior: The Second Generation. Cambridge: Cambridge University Press, pp. 343–344

Films
1977: Hrdy, S., D. B. Hrdy and John Melville Bishop. Stolen copulations; Play and Kidnapped, 16 mm, color.
1980: Hrdy, S., Vishnu Mathur and William Whitehead. "Hanuman langur: Monkey of India," 30 minutes, color. Canadian Broadcasting Corporation. Available on video cassette: CBC Enterprises, P.O. Box 500, Station A, Toronto, Ontario, Canada  M5W 1E6.
1983: "Treatment for film on reproductive strategies of female primates," for BBC Natural History Unit, Bristol, UK.
1988: "Monkeys of Abu." National Geographic Explorer. May 1988.
1990: Nature Advisory Board, Channel Thirteen New York for series on the natural history of sex.
1990: Consultant for "Human Nature" for the British Broadcasting Corporation, Bristol, UK.
2001: Advisor for PBS series Evolution.

Awards
 1981, NYT Notable Books of 1981, The Woman That Never Evolved 1985, Elected, California Academy of Sciences
 1987–88, Guggenheim Fellow
 1988, Radcliffe Graduate Society Medal
 1990, Elected, National Academy of Sciences
 1992, Elected, American Academy of Arts and Sciences
 1999, Publishers Weekly, "Best Books of 1999", Mother Nature 1999, Library Journal, "Best Books of 1999", Mother Nature 2001, Howells Prize for Outstanding Contributions to Biological Anthropology, Mother Nature 2003, University of California Panunzio award
 2007, Centennial Medal, Harvard GSAS
 2011, Elected American Philosophical Society
 2012, Staley Prize from School of Advanced Research for Mothers and Others 
 2012, Howells Prize for Mothers and Others''
 2013, HBES Lifetime Career Award for Distinguished Scientific Contribution, from Human Behavior and Evolution Society
 2014, NAS Award for Scientific Reviewing for "For her insightful and visionary synthesis of a broad range of data and concepts from across the social and biological sciences to illuminate the importance of biosocial processes among mothers, infants, and other social actors in forming the evolutionary crucible of human societies."

References

1946 births
Evolutionary psychologists
Human evolution theorists
Human Behavior and Evolution Society
Living people
Members of the United States National Academy of Sciences
Writers from Dallas
Writers from Houston
Women primatologists
Primatologists
Radcliffe College alumni
Wellesley College alumni
Evolutionary biologists
Women evolutionary biologists
St. John's School (Texas) alumni